The 19th Trampoline World Championships were held in Vancouver, British Columbia, Canada from 23 August to 25 August 1996.

Results

Men

Trampoline Individual

Trampoline Team

Trampoline Synchro

Double Mini Trampoline

Double Mini Trampoline Team

Tumbling

Tumbling Team

Women

Trampoline Individual

Trampoline Team

Trampoline Synchro

Double Mini Trampoline

Double Mini Trampoline Team

Tumbling

Tumbling Team

References
 Trampoline UK

Trampoline World Championships
Trampoline Gymnastics World Championships
Trampoline World Championships
1996 in Canadian sports